Simone Heike Tomaschinski-Gräßer (born 4 April 1970 in Frankfurt am Main, Hessen) is a former field hockey defender from Germany.

She was a member of the Women's National Team that won the silver medal at the 1992 Summer Olympics in Barcelona, Spain. A player from hockey club RTHC Bayer Leverkusen, she competed in two consecutive Summer Olympics, starting in 1992.

References
 databaseOlympics
sports-reference

External links
 

1970 births
Living people
German female field hockey players
Field hockey players at the 1992 Summer Olympics
Field hockey players at the 1996 Summer Olympics
Olympic field hockey players of Germany
Olympic silver medalists for Germany
Place of birth missing (living people)
Olympic medalists in field hockey
Medalists at the 1992 Summer Olympics
Sportspeople from Frankfurt
20th-century German women